Keaweaweʻulaokalani is a name shared by two short-lived princes and heirs to the throne of the Kingdom of Hawaii. Both were named after their father Kamehameha III. In Hawaiian, the name means "the red trail of heaven", signifying the roadway by which the god descends from heaven.

Earlier

Keaweaweʻulaokalani I (1839–1839) was the eldest son of Kamehameha III and his queen consort Kalama Hakaleleponi-i-Kapakuhaili.  The baby boy was named after his father, whose full name was "Keaweaweula Kiwalao Kauikeaouli Kaleiopapa Kalani Waiakua Kalanikau Iokikilo Kiwalao i ke kapu Kamehameha". 

The young Prince Keawe died shortly after his birth. His death left Kamehameha III again childless. His younger brother, Keaweaweʻulaokalani II, would not be born until 1842.

Later

Keaweaweʻulaokalani II (1842–1842) was the second son of Kamehameha III and his queen consort Kalama Hakaleleponi-i-Kapakuhaili.  The baby boy was the namesake of his father and his brother.

Initially given in hānai to Kalākua Kaheiheimālie, he was instead adopted or hānai by his grand aunt, Kekāuluohi and her husband Kanaina when the old governess of Maui died not three days after his birth. The King promised that he would be sent to the Chiefs' Children's School once he was weaned and could walk. He soon developed a fever and died at 31 days old. Dr. Baldwin of Lahaina was convinced that the child was killed by traditional medicinal treatment.

Family tree

References
 
 
 
 
 

Heirs apparent who never acceded
Princes of Hawaii
House of Kamehameha
Heirs to the Hawaiian throne
Burials at the Royal Mausoleum (Mauna ʻAla)
Royalty of the Hawaiian Kingdom
Sibling duos
Royalty who died as children
Sons of kings